Ko Swe Win (born ) is a Burmese journalist based in Australia. He currently serves as the chief correspondent and editor-in-chief of Myanmar Now, a news service. He is currently the director of MYANMAR NOW LTD (ABN 69 653 161 838)  and MYANMAR NOW MEDIA PTY LTD (ABN 81 647 592 354).

Early life and education 
Swe Win was born to a poor family in Rangoon, Burma (now Yangon, Myanmar) . In 1998, he was arrested as a university student, for participating in a student protest in opposition to the military junta, the State Peace and Development Council. Swe Win was imprisoned for 21 years, and was released under a general amnesty in 2005. It was in prison that he began to practice mettā meditation; later on, he would add structure to his practice by participating in meditation retreats in the S. N. Goenka tradition.

Career 
Upon his release, he pursued academic studies in journalism, completing an online undergraduate program and completing a master's degree in journalism at the University of Hong Kong in 2009. He joined The Irrawaddy, ultimately becoming a senior reporter there. With the onset of the 2011–2015 Myanmar political reforms, he returned to Yangon in 2012. He freelanced for Al Jazeera and New York Times, and set up a short-lived, self-financed internet news service.

In 2015, Swe Win co-founded the news service Myanmar Now, with support from the Thomson Reuters Foundation. Also, he founded MYANMAR NOW MEDIA PTY LTD on  03 February 2021, Victoria, Australia. He co-founded a charity organisation with AUNG SHIN and PHYO THIHA CHO on 26 August 2021.

In September 2016, he received President’s Certificate of Honour from Myanmar's Ministry of Information for an investigative expose on 2 teenage maids abused by their employers in a Yangon tailor shop.

Under Swe Win's leadership, Myanmar Now aggressively reported and investigated the 2017 assassination of Ko Ni, Aung San Suu Kyi's legal advisor, which made him the subject of legal backlash from authorities, and death threats from Burmese nationalists. In March 2017, he was assaulted in Sanchaung Township, Yangon, en route home. In March 2017, he was arrested and charged under Article 66(d) of the Myanmar's Telecommunications Law for a Facebook post critical of U Wirathu, a Buddhist monk known for his anti-Muslim rhetoric, specifically for defaming Wirathu. The lawsuit originated from a Patriotic Association of Myanmar supporter of Wirathu. His trial in Mandalay began on 30 July 2017, and Swe Win requested the trial be dropped as the plaintiff's witnesses had repeatedly not shown up for the trial. The case was dropped on 2 July 2019.

In August 2019, Swe Win won the Ramon Magsaysay Award for Emergent Leadership, for his leadership in fostering journalistic integrity and quality in Myanmar, becoming the youngest awardee in the award's history.

On 31 December 2019, Swe Win suffered a gunshot wound while vacationing in Gwa, Myanmar, in a targeted attack. As of December 2020, the assailants remain unidentified, and the government's official investigation have not been publicly disclosed.

In 2021, he received the 2021 Shorenstein Journalism Award from Stanford University’s Walter H. Shorenstein Asia-Pacific Research Center.

See also 

 Myanmar Now

References 

1970s births
Year of birth uncertain
People from Yangon
Burmese Theravada Buddhists
Burmese journalists
Investigative journalists
Ramon Magsaysay Award winners
Failed assassination attempts in Asia
Living people